Walter F. Hewett (1861 – October 7, 1944) was a baseball manager in the National League. In , his only season as manager, he managed the Washington Nationals to a record of 10 wins and 29 losses in 40 games.

See also
List of managers of defunct Major League Baseball teams

External links
Baseball-Reference manager page
Retrosheet

1861 births
1944 deaths
Baseball coaches from Washington, D.C.